Gardin is a surname. Notable people with the surname include:

Blanche Gardin (born 1977), French actress, comedian and writer. 
Gianfranco Gardin (born 1944), Italian prelate
Gösta Gärdin (born 1923), Swedish modern pentathlete and Olympic medalist
Kerri Gardin (born 1984), American professional basketball player
Laura Gardin Fraser (1889–1966), American sculptor
Ron Gardin (born 1944), American football player
Vladimir Gardin (1877–1965), Russian film director

See also
Gerdin, Iran (disambiguation)